Margaret Allen Howe (1897–1989) was a pioneer for Squash in America. She was born in Greenfield, Massachusetts. She won the U.S. Women's Squash Singles National Championship in 1929, 1932 and 1934 after giving birth to a son, William Francis Howe Jr, in 1922 and twin daughters (and future squash champions) Betty and Peggy in 1924.

Her husband, William "Bill" Francis Howe Sr., encouraged her to play, and she played under the name Mrs. William F. Howe. In 1929, Howe organized and won the first sanctioned women's squash tournament in the United States.

Howe Legacy 

In 1955 Virginia Griggs of New York City donated a permanent trophy to an annual women's 5 persons intercity tournament, thus dubbing the tournament The Howe Cup. The tournament still runs to this day in memory Margaret Howe and her daughters.

References

External links
United States Squash Hall of Fame

American female squash players
1890s births
1989 deaths
20th-century American women